Transmission security (TRANSEC) is the component of communications security (COMSEC) that results from the application of measures designed to protect transmissions from interception and exploitation by means other than cryptanalysis. Goals of transmission security include:

 Low probability of interception (LPI)
 Low probability of detection (LPD)
 Antijam — resistance to jamming (EPM or ECCM)

Methods used to achieve transmission security include frequency hopping and spread spectrum where the required pseudorandom sequence generation is controlled by a cryptographic algorithm and key. Such keys are known as transmission security keys (TSK). Modern U.S. and NATO TRANSEC-equipped radios include SINCGARS and HAVE QUICK.

See also
 Electronic warfare

Cryptography
Military communications